Anna Hu (born 1977) is a Taiwanese-American jewelry designer.

Early life 
Anna Hu was born in Tainan in 1977, and raised between Tainan and New York City. Both her parents worked in jewelry wholesale, her father specialized in gemstones while her mother specialized in jade and pearl. As a prodigy cellist, at the age of 13 she was selected by the Taiwanese government to study abroad, attending Walnut Hill School for the Arts, and later the New England Conservatory of Music. However, due to over-practicing, she was diagnosed with shoulder tendonitis in 1997 which forced her to abandon her thriving musical career. Afterwards, she went to study gemology at the Gemological Institute of America, where she earned her Graduate Gemologist certificate. She then studied jewelry design at the Fashion Institute of Technology and received master's degree in art history and arts administration respectively from Parsons School of Design and Columbia University.

Career 
After graduating from Parsons, Hu interned at Christie's and then worked at Van Cleef & Arpels. While working at Harry Winston, she became close with her mentor Maurice Galli, who encouraged her to start her own business.

Hu founded her eponymous jewelry brand "Anna Hu Haute Joaillarie" in 2007, and opened her first boutique store at the Plaza Hotel in 2008.

References

External links 

 

1977 births
Living people
People from Tainan
People from New York City
Taiwanese designers
American jewelry designers
Taiwanese emigrants to the United States
Naturalized citizens of the United States